Wanisha Marie Smith (born July 9, 1985) is an American basketball coach and former player. Smith attended Fairfield High School in Fairfield, Ohio before moving to Riverdale Baptist School in Upper Marlboro, Maryland. Following her high school career, she played college basketball at Duke University and played briefly in the Women's National Basketball Association (WNBA) for the Detroit Shock.

Coaching career
Smith was an assistant coach for Longwood University women's team for eight years, from 2009 to 2017. She then spent two years as an assistant for Towson University women's team before being hired as an assistant at Duke in 2019.

Duke statistics
Source

References

External links
Duke Blue Devils bio

1985 births
Living people
American women's basketball players
Basketball players from Cincinnati
Detroit Shock players
Duke Blue Devils women's basketball players
Guards (basketball)
New York Liberty draft picks